Mr. Nobody is a 2009 science fiction drama film written and directed by Jaco Van Dormael. Through the use of nonlinear narrative and the multiverse hypothesis style, the film tells the life story of Nemo Nobody, a 118-year-old man who is the last mortal on Earth after the human race has achieved quasi-immortality. It stars Jared Leto, Sarah Polley, Diane Kruger, and Linh Dan Pham, with Rhys Ifans, Natasha Little, Toby Regbo, and Juno Temple in supporting roles.

Mr. Nobody was released to generally positive reviews from critics, who praised its nonlinear structure and motifs of human emotion, choice, time, and nature. Despite a strong performance in its domestic market, the film was a box office disappointment, failing to make back its production costs. It later found commercial success on home video and streaming services, establishing Mr. Nobody as a cult classic. The film received awards and nominations in a variety of categories, with particular praise given to its direction, screenplay, cinematography and performances. It earned the André Cavens Award for Best Film given by the Belgian Film Critics Association.

At the Venice International Film Festival, the film was submitted for consideration for the Golden Lion, but lost to Lebanon (2009). Sylvie Olivé was later awarded Outstanding Technical Contribution, while Jared Leto was listed as the runner-up for Best Actor. At the 2011 Magritte Awards, Mr. Nobody received a leading seven nominations and won six: Best Film, Best Director, Best Screenplay, Best Cinematography, Best Original Score, and Best Editing. It held the record for the most Magritte Awards won by a single film, before being beaten by Mothers' Instinct (2018) with nine. The film also received a European Film Award, Fonske Award, Golden Camera Award, and two Silverback Awards. The Brussels Film Critics Circle named Mr. Nobody one of the top ten films of the year.

Awards and nominations

See also

2010 in film
Cinema of Belgium

References

External links
 

Lists of accolades by film